William Gavin Clegg (29 June 1869 – 18 May 1949) was an English first-class cricketer.

The son of Neville Clegg, he was born at Altrincham in June 1869. He was educated at Winchester College, before going up to Magdalen College, Oxford. While studying at Oxford, Clegg made two appearances in first-class cricket for Oxford University in 1891, appearing against Gentlemen of England and H. Philipson's XI. He scored 35 runs in these matches, in addition to taking 5 wickets with best figures of 3 for 35. After graduating from Oxford, Clegg became a farmer. He served in the First World War in the Cheshire Regiment, being commissioned as a second lieutenant in January 1916. He later served as the High Sheriff of Cheshire in 1932. Clegg died in May 1949 at Delamere, Cheshire.

References

External links

1869 births
1949 deaths
People from Altrincham
People educated at Winchester College
Alumni of Magdalen College, Oxford
English cricketers
Oxford University cricketers
English farmers
British Army personnel of World War I
Cheshire Regiment officers
High Sheriffs of Cheshire